NOTCH regulated ankyrin repeat protein is a protein that in humans is encoded by the NRARP gene.

References

Further reading